The International Hot Rod Association (IHRA) is the second-largest drag racing sanctioning body after the National Hot Rod Association (NHRA).

The Carrier Era 1971-1987
The IHRA was formed in November 1970 by businessman Larry Carrier.  Throughout this period the organization was operated primarily in the south-eastern United States from its headquarters in Bristol, Tennessee.  The IHRA initially followed the NHRA's professional class structure of Top Fuel, Funny Car and Pro Stock until the 1984 season when it decided to drop the premier Top Fuel category, an arrangement that only lasted three years before the class was reinstated for the 1987 season.  Carrier is also credited with initiating drag racing's long-term sponsorship association with the R.J. Reynolds Tobacco Company's Winston brand, which has ended.

1988-98
IHRA headquarters briefly moved to Waco, Texas in 1988 after it was purchased by Texan racer and track operator Billy Meyer who made many changes to the organization, some of which proved controversial amongst racers such as completely restructuring the sportsman classes overnight.  Another radical change came as a result of Meyer's ownership of the Texas Motorplex, considered then to be the premier drag racing facility in the world.  The Motorplex had previously been the NHRA's flagship track but for 1988 it hosted two IHRA national events and was the site of Top Fuel's first 4 second run by Eddie Hill.  Other changes included the addition of a 'junior' Pro Stock class for small-block and V6 engines, named Factory Modified, which lasted until the end of the 1990 season.  However, financial failure meant that Meyer's reign lasted just one year before the association was again sold on.

In 1988, the headquarters moved back to Bristol, Tennessee, under the ownership of Ted Jones and Jim Ruth.

In 1990 an all new class, Pro Modified, was introduced which has since become a feature at IHRA events and has become one of drag racing’s most successful classes enjoying popularity in both North America and Europe.  During this period Pro Modified became the IHRA's main asset in its recovery from the 1988 season that had nearly destroyed it.

However, the nitromethane powered Funny Car class was dropped for the 1991 season only to be reinstated for 1992 before being dropped again, not to return until 2006. In 2009 IHRA dropped the funny car class again due to sponsor problems caused by a deep recession in the American economy.

Bill Bader, Clear Channel, Feld and Palm Beach
In 1998 the organization was purchased by Bill Bader who significantly expanded the promotion in the Great Lakes from his headquarters in Norwalk, Ohio. He sold the IHRA to Clear Channel Communications, but remained as president until his retirement in October 2004. The headquarters remain in Norwalk, which was once the site of the IHRA's flagship World Nationals event.

In 2005, Clear Channel was split into Clear Channel Radio and Live Nation, with IHRA becoming part of the latter. Feld Entertainment bought Live Nation's motorsports division in 2008, and operated the IHRA for four years.

In 2010, the IHRA adopted the "Chicago style" format for professional classes, which was criticised by racers.

IHRA was purchased by Palm Beach International Raceway owners in 2013 and was renamed IHRA Motorsports. PBIR also owns and operates Memphis International Raceway since 2011. Those companies were integrated into IRG Sports + Entertainment also in 2013.  IRG also eliminated the Chicago format for 2014. IRG has since sold off all of is race track, only operating the sanctioning body.

IHRA became a sportsman only series with track sanctioning after 2014 with elimination of national events, leaving NHRA the only viable drag racing series for the general public.

Outside the Continental USA
In addition to tracks in 30 states in the continental United States, IHRA oversees tracks in Canada, Hawaii, and Aruba. Despite the "international" in its name the IHRA was for years based solely in the United States.  However, in recent years the organization has made significant inroads north of the border. The IHRA's first major event in Canada was a one-off in 1992 at Toronto Motorsports Park in Cayuga, Ontario but it wasn't until later in the decade that Canadian events became the regular fixtures they are today.

The IHRA is now the premiere motorsports sanctioning body in Canada, holding three national drag racing events. One event is hosted in the province of Ontario (Grand Bend) and one in Alberta (Edmonton).

In addition to Canada, there are IHRA tracks outside the Continental USA in Hawaii (Hilo Dragstrip), Alaska (Alaska Raceway Park), and Aruba (International Raceway Park Aruba).

In 2015, the IHRA also added three Australian tracks following the split from Australian National Drag Racing Association Perth Motorplex, Willowbank Raceway, and Sydney Dragway joining as part of the IHRA-sanctioned 400 Thunder series.  A few months later, Cairns' Springmount Raceway joined the IHRA. Shortly thereafter, in 2016, Perth Motorplex returned to ANDRA sanctioning following an extensive tender process run by the Western Australia State Government, which owns the Perth Motorplex. ANDRA was deemed to have a more comprehensive set or rules and procedures which Drag Racing events would be run in accordance with, one major point being that IHRA Australia did not submit a proposal to the Government. IHRA Australia does not have a published rulebook. ANDRA has periodically  run Group One cars since (Top Fuel, Funny Car, Pro Stock), as most teams have switched to IHRA and its 400 Thunder series. However, recently Top Fuel Australia (the organization that represents the Top Fuel Team owners) extracted itself from the 400 Thunder Series due to the series lack of National coverage and steady decline since its inception. More recently, the Australian Government appointed Motorsport Australia organization stated that it does not acknowledge IHRA Australia as a Drag Racing sanctioning body, for numerous reasons.

All Time Win Leaders

Professional

Sportsman

References

External links 
 

Organizations based in Florida
Organizations established in 1970
1970 establishments in Florida
Auto racing organizations in the United States
Auto racing series in Canada
Auto racing series in the United States
Drag racing organizations